Leon Valley is a city in Bexar County, Texas, United States. It is an enclave on the northwest side of San Antonio and is part of the San Antonio-New Braunfels Metropolitan Statistical Area. The population was 11,542 at the 2020 census. Leon Valley is an independent municipality surrounded by the city of San Antonio.

History
Leon Valley was developed in the 1940s as a farming community on Bandera Road between Helotes and San Antonio. In 1952 residents filed a petition  for incorporation as an independent  city since the residents did not wish to be annexed by San Antonio. Leon Valley incorporated in 1954 under the leadership of its founding mayor, Raymond Rimkus. In 1960, it had a population of 536 and by 1970 Its population grew to 1,960. In 1990 it had 9,581 people.

Geography
Leon Valley is located at  (29.498280, −98.612594). This is 3 miles southwest of the South Texas Medical Center, 8 miles west of Uptown San Antonio, and 10 miles northwest of Downtown San Antonio.

Climate

Demographics

As of the 2020 United States census, there were 11,542 people, 4,562 households, and 3,036 families residing in the city.

2010 Census
At the 2010 census, there were 10,151 people, 4,158 households, and 2,636 families living in the city. The racial makeup of the city was 80.98% White, 3.98% African American, 0.57% Native American, 3.71% Asian, 0.19% Pacific Islander, 8.06% from other races, and 2.51% from two or more races. Hispanic or Latino of any race were 56.22% of the population.

Of the 4,158 households 24.22% had children under the age of 18 living with them, 45.98% were married couples living together, 12.70% had a female householder with no husband present, and 36.60% were non-families. 29.89% of households were one person and 11.54% were one person aged 65 or older. The average household size was 2.44 and the average family size was 3.03.

The age distribution was 23.09% under the age of 19, 6.82% from 20 to 24, 27.32% from 25 to 44, 25.85% from 45 to 64, and 16.92% 65 or older. The median age was 39.4 years. For every 100 females, there were 92.66 males. For every 100 females age 18 and over, there were 88.62 males

2000 Census
At the 2000 census there were 9,239 people, 3,576 households, and 2,521 families living in the city. The population density was 2,708.0 people per square mile (1,046.1/km). There were 3,672 housing units at an average density of 1,076.3 per square mile (415.8/km).  The racial makeup of the city was 78.07% White, 2.77% African American, 0.67% Native American, 1.95% Asian, 0.15% Pacific Islander, 13.19% from other races, and 3.19% from two or more races. Hispanic or Latino of any race were 44.65%.

Of the 3,576 households 29.7% had children under the age of 18 living with them, 56.0% were married couples living together, 11.0% had a female householder with no husband present, and 29.5% were non-families. 24.8% of households were one person and 8.3% were one person aged 65 or older. The average household size was 2.56 and the average family size was 3.07.

The age distribution was 23.4% under the age of 18, 9.0% from 18 to 24, 28.1% from 25 to 44, 26.0% from 45 to 64, and 13.5% 65 or older. The median age was 38 years. For every 100 females, there were 94.9 males. For every 100 females age 18 and over, there were 90.3 males.

The median household income was $49,079 and the median family income  was $56,543. Males had a median income of $32,917 versus $28,700 for females. The per capita income for the city was $21,743. About 4.8% of families and 8.1% of the population were below the poverty line, including 12.6% of those under age 18 and 6.6% of those age 65 or over. The median home price for Leon Valley has appreciated every year since 2000. In 2005 the median home price in Leon Valley was $95,480.

Government and infrastructure
The United States Post Office operates the Leon Valley Post Office at 6825 Huebner Road.

Education
Leon Valley Residents are zoned to schools in the Northside Independent School District.

Leon Valley is served by the following elementary schools: 
 Glen Oaks Elementary School (San Antonio)
 Rita Kay Driggers Elementary School (Leon Valley)
 Leon Valley Elementary School (Leon Valley)
 Oak Hills Terrace Elementary School (San Antonio)
 Powell Elementary School (San Antonio)

Leon Valley is served by the following middle schools: 
 Neff Middle School (San Antonio)
 Ross Middle School (San Antonio)
 Rudder Middle School (San Antonio)

Leon Valley is served by the following high schools: 
 John Marshall High School (Leon Valley)
 Holmes High School (San Antonio)

Leon Valley also operates the Leon Valley Public Library .

References

External links
 Leon Valley official website
 Leon Valley Housing Statistics
  Handbook of Texas Online article

Cities in Bexar County, Texas
Cities in Texas
Populated places established in 1952
Greater San Antonio
1952 establishments in Texas
Enclaves in the United States